Harry Connick may refer to:

Harry Connick Sr. (born 1926), American district attorney
Harry Connick Jr. (born 1967), American musician, singer, and actor